Alassane Diallo may refer to:
 Alassane Diallo (Senegalese footballer), born 1989
 Alassane Diallo (Malian footballer), born 1995